Ausleben is a municipality in the Börde district in Saxony-Anhalt, Germany.

References

Municipalities in Saxony-Anhalt
Börde (district)